Eurythecta leucothrinca is a species of moth of the family Tortricidae. It is found in New Zealand.  The habitat consists of montane to sub-alpine grasslands and coastal salt marshes.

Adult females are brachypterous. Adults have been recorded on wing from April to late June.

The larvae probably feed on leaf-litter.

References

Moths described in 1931
Archipini
Moths of New Zealand